Francis John Joseph Brennan (May 7, 1894 – July 2, 1968) was an American cardinal of the Roman Catholic Church. He served as dean of the Roman Rota from 1959 to 1968, and then as prefect of the Congregation for the Discipline of the Sacraments from 1968 until his death. Brennan was elevated to the cardinalate in 1967.

Biography
An American of Irish extraction, Francis Brennan was born in Shenandoah, Pennsylvania, to James and Margaret (née Connors) Brennan. He studied at St. Charles Borromeo Seminary in Overbrook before furthering his studies in Rome, where he attended the Pontifical Roman Athenaeum S. Apollinare and the Pontifical Roman Seminary. He was ordained to the priesthood by Cardinal Basilio Pompili on April 3, 1920.

Upon his return to the United States, Brennan did pastoral work in the Archdiocese of Philadelphia from 1924 to 1928, when he became a member of the faculty at his alma mater, St. Charles Seminary. He was also an official of the archdiocesan curia of Philadelphia from 1937 to 1940. Described as a "brilliant canon lawyer", he was named an auditor of the Roman Rota on August 1, 1940, rising to become its dean on December 14, 1959.

On June 10, 1967, Brennan was appointed Titular Archbishop of Tubunae in Mauretania by Pope Paul VI. He received his episcopal consecration on the following June 25 from Cardinal Eugène-Gabriel-Gervais-Laurent Tisserant, with Bishops Joseph Carroll McCormick and Luigi Faveri serving as co-consecrators, at the church of Sant'Anselmo all'Aventino.

Paul VI created him Cardinal-Deacon of S. Eustachio in the consistory the next day, on June 26, 1967. Brennan was later named prefect of the Congregation for the Discipline of the Sacraments on January 15, 1968.

The cardinal died from a heart attack in Philadelphia, aged 74. At the time of his death, he had risen to the highest post within the Holy See ever held by an American. Brennan is buried in the crypt of SS. Peter and Paul Cathedral-Basilica.

References

External links

 

1894 births
1968 deaths
20th-century American cardinals
Burials at the Cathedral Basilica of Saints Peter and Paul (Philadelphia)
Cardinals created by Pope Paul VI
Catholics from Pennsylvania
Members of the Congregation for the Discipline of the Sacraments
Participants in the Second Vatican Council
People from Shenandoah, Pennsylvania
Pontifical Roman Seminary alumni
St. Charles Borromeo Seminary alumni